Analphabetapolothology is an anthology album by Cap'n Jazz released in 1998 on Jade Tree Records. It catalogues almost every song recorded and released by the band during their time together except an early song called "Naive."

The album consists of the band's first and only full length studio album along with songs from EPs, compilation tracks, live recordings, and previously unreleased outtakes and demos.

Track listing

Cap'n Jazz albums
1998 compilation albums
Jade Tree (record label) albums